The Dominica Public Service Union is a trade union in Dominica. It was founded in 1939 as the Dominica Civil Service Association, registering as a trade union in 1961.

References

Trade unions in Dominica
Public sector trade unions
Trade unions established in 1939